Chulpan (Sulpan) is a rural locality (a village) in Kenger-Meneuzovsky Selsoviet, Bizhbulyaksky District, Bashkortostan, Russia. The population was 121 as of 2010. There is 1 street.

Geography 
Chulpan is located 7 km east of Bizhbulyak (the district's administrative centre) by road. Barsh is the nearest rural locality.

References 

Rural localities in Bizhbulyaksky District